Joseph Thomas Henry Clark (2 March 1920 – 31 January 2008) was an English professional footballer who played in the Football League for Leyton Orient as a full back.

Honours 
Margate

 Kent League First Division: 1947–48
 Kent League Cup: 1947–48
 Kent Senior Shield: 1947–48

References 

English footballers

Clapton Orient F.C. wartime guest players
English Football League players
1920 births
2008 deaths
People from Bermondsey
Association football fullbacks
Erith & Belvedere F.C. players
Dartford F.C. players
Gravesend United F.C. players
Ramsgate F.C. players
Margate F.C. players
Leyton Orient F.C. players
Kent Football League (1894–1959) players